Kirovo may refer to:
Kirovo, Bulgaria, a village in Burgas Province, Bulgaria
Kirovo, Kazakhstan, a village in Almaty Province, Kazakhstan
Kirovo, Russia, several rural localities in Russia